Harry Wheeler "Fred" Nickson (born 25 January 1919, date of death unknown) was an English footballer who played as a goalkeeper. He played three times for Liverpool in the 1945–46 FA Cup, and also appeared in ten Football League (North) games.

References

1919 births
Year of death missing
English footballers
Liverpool F.C. players
Place of birth missing
Association football goalkeepers